Loredana Zugna (born 1 May 1952) is an Italian sports shooter. She competed in the women's 25 metre pistol event at the 1984 Summer Olympics.

References

1952 births
Living people
Italian female sport shooters
Olympic shooters of Italy
Shooters at the 1984 Summer Olympics
Sportspeople from Trieste